Rosemary Turare-Omundsen (born 6 June 1964) is a Papua New Guinean former middle-distance runner. She competed in the women's 1500 metres at the 1992 Summer Olympics.

References

External links

1964 births
Living people
Athletes (track and field) at the 1992 Summer Olympics
Papua New Guinean female middle-distance runners
Papua New Guinean female long-distance runners
Olympic athletes of Papua New Guinea
Athletes (track and field) at the 1994 Commonwealth Games
Commonwealth Games competitors for Papua New Guinea
Place of birth missing (living people)